Crvenjak Lake is a lake of Bosnia and Herzegovina. It is located in the municipality of Čvrsnica. The lake is oval-shaped, approximately 70 meters long and 50 meters wide. It has a depth of approximately 9 meters.

See also
List of lakes in Bosnia and Herzegovina

References

Lakes of Bosnia and Herzegovina